The Seletar Expressway (Abbreviation: SLE) is a highway in Singapore that traverses the northern end of the island and joins the Central Expressway (CTE) and the Tampines Expressway (TPE) in Seletar to the Bukit Timah Expressway (BKE) in Kranji.

History

In the 1980s, the SLE was proposed to link BKE in Kranji to the junction of TPE and CTE in Yio Chu Kang. In 1983, it was announced that SLE would only be built after work on the northern expansion of SLE from Toa Payoh to Yio Chu Kang was completed. 

The first phase of the construction of SLE consisted of a stretch between Yio Chu Kang and Upper Thomson Road and was opened on 24 March 1990.

Later on, this stretch was extended on 24 March 1990 to connect SLE and CTE. Later, it was extended from Upper Thomson Road to the BKE. It replaced various roads - Lorong Handalan, Lorong Lentor, Lorong Selangin and Lorong Hablor.

The SLE is a six-lane dual carriageway. The Upper Thomson Road - BKE extension was opened in two parts: from BKE to Woodlands Avenue 2 on 5 November 1995, and from Woodlands Avenue 2 to Upper Thomson Road on 22 February 1998. Construction of the second phase began in 1992. The interchange of SLE and BKE was completed in 1994. The third stage of construction, completing in July 1996 from Woodlands Avenue 2 to Lorong Gambas. The final phase involved the construction from Lorong Gambas to Upper Thomson Road. The last sector of this expressway which opened was the last completed expressway project in Singapore until the opening of a section of the Kallang–Paya Lebar Expressway on 28 October 2007.

It had the largest clearing of the roads in the history - Lorong Gambas, Jalan Ulu Sembawang, and some dirt tracks.

List of exits

References

External links

Expressways in Singapore
Ang Mo Kio
Mandai
Seletar
Woodlands, Singapore
Yishun
Transport in North-East Region, Singapore